The Church of San Juan Bautista (Spanish: Iglesia de San Juan Bautista) is a church located in Talamanca de Jarama, Spain. It was declared Bien de Interés Cultural in 1931.

It was built in the  late 12th century or the early 13th century, in Romanesque style. However, only the apse has survived from the original edifice, since the rest was demolished in the 16th century and rebuilt according to the Renaissance manner.

References 

Churches in the Community of Madrid
Romanesque architecture in the Community of Madrid
Renaissance architecture in the Community of Madrid
Bien de Interés Cultural landmarks in the Community of Madrid